Beiqijia Town is a town located in the southwestern corner of Changping District, Beijing, China. It borders Baishan and Xiaotangshan Towns in the north, Houshayu Town and Sunhe Township in the east, Laiguangying Township and Tiantongyuanbei Subdistrict in the south, Dongxiaokou Town in the southwest, and Shahe Town in the west. Its census population was 308,907 as of 2020.

History

Administrative divisions 
As of 2021, Beiqijia Town oversees 42 subdivisions, where 23 are communities, and 19 are villages:

Gallery

See also 

 List of township-level divisions of Beijing

References 

Changping District
Towns in Beijing